Ceryx ciprianii is a moth of the subfamily Arctiinae. It was described by Emilio Berio in 1937 and is found in the Democratic Republic of the Congo.

References

Ceryx (moth)
Moths described in 1937
Insects of the Democratic Republic of the Congo
Moths of Africa
Endemic fauna of the Democratic Republic of the Congo